Beatrice Jean Allard ("Bea") (born July 10, 1930) is a former pitcher who played in the All-American Girls Professional Baseball League during the  season.

Beatrice Allard was a fireballing right-hander, with a deceptive sidearm delivery, whose promising career was cut short by an injured shoulder after being forced to change her delivery.

Born in Muskegon, Michigan, Allard learned to play sandlot ball with other neighborhood kids when she was a youngster. She became an avid fan of the Muskegon Lassies and did not miss a single one of the team's home games during their first three seasons in All American Girls Professional Baseball League. One day she decided to assist a tryout to help a friend catcher by tossing a few balls sidearm, gradually increasing the distance each time,  even though she had no intention of playing in the league. But she had a fine throwing arm, and league's president Max Carey spotted her as a potential pitcher, so he signed her to a contract.

Allard joined the league in 1949 with her beloved Lassies. In the season opener in Muskegon, against the Kenosha Comets, she was called by team's manager Carson Bigbee to relieve in the top of the ninth inning with the bases loaded and nobody out. "The manager tossed me a ball and said 'Okay kid, see what you can do'", Allard explained in an interview. She struck out the first two batters and the third popped out to preserve the win and earn her a save. She was used again the next night, this time as a starter. "I pitched five good innings and was able to hit a triple first time up and a single later", she remembered.

As the year progressed, Allard was going along fine until a sore arm midway through the season quickly dimmed her performance. They tried to change my delivery and I got all messed up, she said. I didn't complain, I didn't want to be a baby, she added. Allard finished the season with her arm in a sling and decided to go to a doctor, who told her that she had a dead arm and her playing days were over.

After her baseball career ended, Allard joined the U.S. Army as a cryptographer and was stationed in San Francisco for three years. Afterwards, she returned to Michigan and worked in the Grand Rapids Employment Office for 31 years.

In 1988, Allard became part of Women in Baseball, a permanent display based at the Baseball Hall of Fame and Museum in Cooperstown, New York, which was unveiled to honor the entire All-American Girls Professional Baseball League rather than any individual personality. It was not really a well known fact until filmmaker Penny Marshall premiered her 1992 film A League of Their Own, which was a fictionalized account of activities in the AAGPBL. Starring Geena Davis, Tom Hanks, Madonna, Lori Petty and Rosie O'Donnell, this film brought many of the real AAGPBL former players a rebirth of celebrity.

Beatrice Allard is a long-time resident of Lillian, Alabama, where she still receives fan mail, including requests for her autograph.

Career statistics
Pitching

Batting

Fielding

Sources

All-American Girls Professional Baseball League players
Baseball pitchers
Baseball players from Michigan
Sportspeople from Muskegon, Michigan
1930 births
Living people
People from Baldwin County, Alabama
Muskegon Lassies players
21st-century American women